Vuai Abdallah Khamis (born May 17, 1960) is a Member of Parliament in the National Assembly of Tanzania.

References
Parliament of Tanzania website

Tanzanian MPs 2005–2010
Living people
1960 births
Place of birth missing (living people)
21st-century Tanzanian politicians